Micara is a surname of Italian origin. Notable people with the surname include:

Clemente Micara (1879–1965), Italian Cardinal of the Catholic Church
Ludovico Micara (1775–1847), Italian Capuchin and Cardinal

See also
Scopula micara, moth of the family Geometridae

Italian-language surnames